Pandora TV (판도라TV) was a video sharing website that hosts user-generated content. Founded in October 2004, Pandora TV is the first video sharing website in the world to attach advertisement to user-submitted video clips and to provide unlimited storage space for users to upload. The operating company, Pandora TV Co., Ltd., has its headquarters in the Seoul-Gangnam Building in Yeoksam-dong, Gangnam-gu, Seoul.

In 2007, it was the fastest growing website in South Korea. In 2008, it was the largest video sharing website in South Korea, and it had 3.6 million members. At the time, it had 35% of the Korean marketshare for video sharing sites.

The site is available in Korean, and since April 2008, in English, Chinese, and Japanese.

Pandora TV raised over $16 million from Silicon Valley venture capital firms - Altos Ventures and DCM - in two consecutive funding rounds 2006 and 2007, which represents the largest foreign investment made so far on any Korean Internet start-up.

On January 31, 2023, Pandora TV will end its service.

Company history

October 2004 - Launched video sharing portal Pandora TV
October 2005 - Launched iCF ad format
October 2005 - Changed the corporate name from Lettee.com to Pandora TV Co.
   June 2006 - Completed Series A financing of over $6 million from a Silicon Valley-based investment group led by Altos Ventures
  April 2007 - Completed Series B financing of $10 million led by DCM (formerly known as Doll Capital Management)
December 2007 - Selected as one of the Top 100 Global Tech Startups in 2007 by Red Herring 
December 2007 - Launched Pandora TV Global Beta service
  March 2008 - Acquired The K-Multimedia Player, a premium video player solution
  April 2008 - Officially launched Pandora TV global service offered in four languages (English, Chinese, Japanese and Korean)
  July 2015 - Pandora TV uses Youtube to host it's videos and is no longer an independent platform
 January 31, 2023 - Pandora TV service has ended.With the end of service, you will now be redirect to Moviebloc.com.

Logo

See also 

 K-Multimedia Player
 YouTube

References

External links
Pandora TV 
K-Multimedia Player 
Pandora TV Blog 

Companies based in Gyeonggi Province
Companies established in 2004
Companies disestablished in 2023
South Korean social networking websites
South Korean brands
Video on demand services
Video hosting